An adrenergic agonist is a drug that stimulates a response from the adrenergic receptors. The five main categories of adrenergic receptors are: α1, α2, β1, β2, and β3, although there are more subtypes, and agonists vary in specificity between these receptors, and may be classified respectively. However, there are also other mechanisms of adrenergic agonism. Epinephrine and norepinephrine are endogenous and broad-spectrum. More selective agonists are more useful in pharmacology.

An  agent is a drug, or other substance, which has effects similar to, or the same as, epinephrine (adrenaline). Thus, it is a kind of sympathomimetic agent. Alternatively, it may refer to something which is susceptible to epinephrine, or similar substances, such as a biological receptor (specifically, the adrenergic receptors).

Receptors

Directly acting adrenergic agonists act on adrenergic receptors. All adrenergic receptors are G-protein coupled, activating signal transduction pathways. The G-protein receptor can affect the function of adenylate cyclase or phospholipase C, an agonist of the receptor will upregulate the effects on the downstream pathway (it will not necessarily upregulate the pathway itself).

The receptors are broadly grouped into α and β receptors. There are two subclasses of α-receptor, α1 and α2 which are further subdivided into α1A, α1B, α1D, α2A, α2B and α2C. The α2C receptor has been reclassed from α1C, due to its greater homology with the α2 class, giving rise to the somewhat confusing nomenclature. The β receptors are divided into β1, β2 and β3. The receptors are classed physiologically, though pharmacological selectivity for receptor subtypes exists and is important in the clinical application of adrenergic agonists (and, indeed, antagonists).

From an overall perspective, α1 receptors activate phospholipase C (via Gq), increasing the activity of protein kinase C (PKC); α2 receptors inhibit adenylate cyclase (via Gi), decreasing the activity of protein kinase A (PKA); β receptors activate adenylate cyclase (via Gs), thus increasing the activity of PKA. Agonists of each class of receptor elicit these downstream responses.

Uptake and storage
Indirectly acting adrenergic agonists affect the uptake and storage mechanisms involved in adrenergic signalling.

Two uptake mechanisms exist for terminating the action of adrenergic catecholamines - uptake 1 and uptake 2. Uptake 1 occurs at the presynaptic nerve terminal to remove the neurotransmitter from the synapse. Uptake 2 occurs at postsynaptic and peripheral cells to prevent the neurotransmitter from diffusing laterally.

There is also enzymatic degradation of the catecholamines by two main enzymes - monoamine oxidase and catechol-o-methyl transferase. Respectively, these enzymes oxidise monoamines (including catecholamines) and methylate the hydroxyl groups of the phenyl moiety of catecholamines. These enzymes can be targeted pharmacologically. Inhibitors of these enzymes act as indirect agonists of adrenergic receptors as they prolong the action of catecholamines at the receptors.

Structure–activity relationship
In general, a primary or secondary aliphatic amine separated by 2 carbons from a substituted benzene ring is minimally required for high agonist activity.

Mechanisms
A great number of drugs are available which can affect adrenergic receptors. 
Other drugs affect the uptake and storage mechanisms of adrenergic catecholamines, prolonging their action. The following headings provide some useful examples to illustrate the various ways in which drugs can enhance the effects of adrenergic receptors.

Direct action
These drugs act directly on one or more adrenergic receptors. According to receptor selectivity they are two types:

Non-selective: drugs act on one or more receptors; these are: 
 Adrenaline (almost all adrenergic receptors).
 Noradrenaline (acts on α1, α2, β1).
 Isoprenaline (acts on β1, β2, β3).
 Dopamine (acts on α1, α2, β1, D1, D2).
Selective: drugs which act on a single receptor only; these are further classified into α selective & β selective.
 α1 selective: phenylephrine, methoxamine, midodrine, oxymetazoline.
 α2 selective: α-methyldopa, clonidine, brimonidine, dexmedetomidine. 
 β1 selective: dobutamine.
 β2 selective: salbutamol/albuterol, terbutaline, salmeterol, formoterol, pirbuterol, clenbuterol.

Indirect action
These are agents that increase neurotransmission in endogenous chemicals, namely epinephrine and norepinephrine.

Mixed action
 Ephedrine
 Pseudoephedrine

See also
Adrenergic receptor
Alpha adrenergic agonist
List of adrenergic drugs

References

External links
Virtual Chembook article on adrenergic drugs

Endocrine system